Brockton Area Transit Authority, branded as Brockton Area Transit (BAT), is a public, non-profit organization in Massachusetts, charged with providing public transportation to the Brockton area, consisting of the city of Brockton and the adjoining towns of Abington, Avon, Bridgewater, East Bridgewater, Easton, Hanson, Rockland, Stoughton, West Bridgewater and Whitman.

BAT provides fixed route bus services and paratransit services within its area. BAT's buses provide interchange with each other and with the Middleborough/Lakeville commuter rail line of the Massachusetts Bay Transportation Authority (MBTA) at Brockton station. BAT also runs a fixed route bus service from Brockton to Ashmont station on MBTA's Red subway line.

, BAT operated a fleet of 41 Gillig Low Floor buses, 19 Ford Elkhart Coach buses, and 40 minibuses of two types.

All BAT transit buses accept cash payment or allow fare to be paid via CharlieCard.

History
Brockton bus service was previously operated by Union Street Railway, until a protracted labor strike prompted the city to buy the routes and buses in September 1973. One year later, this system was reorganized as BAT to secure state funding, and encourage regional participation.

Routes
Many routes leaving the BAT Centre in Brockton are scheduled on a pulse system - meeting at the central hub simultaneously - to provide easy transfers.

Twelve routes primarily serve Brockton:

1: Montello Street Via North Main Street
2: S. Plaza/Campello Via Main Street
3: VA Hospital Via Belmont
4: Westgate Via Pleasant
4A: Westgate Mall Via N. Warren
5: Brockton Hospital Via Centre St.
6: Massasoit Via Crescent St.
8: Southfield Via Warren & Plan St.
9: Pearl Via W. Elm & Torrey
10: Lisa & Howard Via N. Quincy & Court
11: Cary Hill and the Village
13: Mini Maller

Four longer routes run to other towns:
12: 
14: Stoughton
RF: Rockland Flex

Five routes - four on-campus shuttles, and route 28 to the BAT Centre - serve Bridgewater State University.

BAT also offers door-to-door para-transit service called Dial-a-BAT.

Gallery

See also
Greater Attleboro Taunton Regional Transit Authority, also serving the same countries of Bristol, Norfolk, and Plymouth.

References

External links

BAT official website

1974 establishments in Massachusetts
Bus transportation in Massachusetts
Brockton, Massachusetts
Government agencies established in 1974
Transportation in Bristol County, Massachusetts
Transportation in Norfolk County, Massachusetts
Transportation in Plymouth County, Massachusetts